Barnes Baptist Church is a church in Lonsdale Road, Barnes in Richmond upon Thames, London. It is a member of the London Baptist Association.

Barnes has had a Baptist church since 1866. The original chapel was located on Stanton Road. The church on the present site dates from 1934.

Morning worship is held on Sundays at 11am. There are also occasional Sunday evening services.

Notes and references

External links
 Official website
 London Baptist Association

1866 establishments in England
Baptist churches in the London Borough of Richmond upon Thames
Churches completed in 1934
Churches in Barnes, London